David Hoogsteen (born November 10, 1974) is a Canadian retired ice hockey coach and center who was an All-American for North Dakota.

Career
Hoogsteen played junior hockey for his hometown Thunder Bay Flyers. Over three seasons he increased his point total, finishing as the team's leading scorer in 1995 and helping them win the Dudley Hewitt Cup. The following year he began attending the University of North Dakota, joining his brother Kevin on the ice hockey team. In his first season with the Fighting Sioux, Hoogsteen provided depth scoring but came into his own during his sophomore year. UND shot up the standings, finishing atop the WCHA standings for the first time in a decade and went on to win the conference championship. Hoogsteen was named tournament MVP and led the team to their first NCAA Tournament appearance since 1990 and the Fighting Sioux went on a roll. The team scored six goals in each of their three games, winning the national championship. Hoogsteen scored twice in the final game, including the game-winning goal and was named an All-American for the year. Over his final two years with North Dakota, Hoogsteen remained a key contributor. He helped the club post three consecutive 30-win seasons, winning the regular season championship each time. Unfortunately, in '98 and '99 UND lost in conference championship game as well as their first NCAA tournament match.

After graduating, Hoogsteen's professional career began with a shirt stint in Germany but he ended up finishing the year in the ECHL. After two more seasons playing in the lower minor leagues, he returned to Europe and played a couple of years with the Amsterdam Tigers. He retired as a player in 2004 after helping the club win back-to-back Eredivisie championships.

Statistics

Regular season and playoffs

Awards and honors

References

External links

1974 births
Living people
AHCA Division I men's ice hockey All-Americans
Canadian ice hockey left wingers
Fayetteville Force players
Ice hockey people from Ontario
North Dakota Fighting Hawks men's ice hockey players
Richmond Renegades players
Rockford IceHogs (UHL) players
Sportspeople from Thunder Bay
Straubing Tigers players
Trenton Titans players